Tarka may refer to:

Tarka, also Chhaunk, in Indian cuisine is a method of seasoning food with spices heated in oil or ghee
Tarka, Nigeria, a Local Government Area in Benue State, Nigeria
Tarka, Niger
Tarka the Otter, a 1927 novel by Henry Williamson
Tarka the Otter (film), based on the novel
Tarka Line, a railway line in Devon, England
Tarka Trail, a series of footpaths assembled from former railway lines
Tarka (medication), a brand name for an antihypertensive medication
Tarka (flute), also tharqa, a traditional flute of the Andes
David Tarka (born 1983), Australian football player
Taharqa, Nubian pharaoh of the twenty-fifth Dynasty of Egypt
Tarka (film), a 1988 Kannada language movie
Taarka, an Oregonian quartet
Tarka Cordell (1968–2008), British musician, writer and record producer
Wiesław Tarka (born 1964), Polish diplomat
The Tarka, an alien race in the video game Sword of the Stars

See also
 Tarka sastra, an Indian science of dialectics, logic and reasoning